Tabing Ilog is a Philippine teen drama television series that was aired on ABS-CBN. It was top billed by Kaye Abad, Paolo Contis, John Lloyd Cruz, Desiree del Valle, Patrick Garcia, Baron Geisler, Paula Peralejo, and Jodi Sta. Maria. The premise of the series focuses on the friendship of best friends Eds, Badong, Rovic, Corrinne, James, Fonzy, Anne, and George. The series was aired from March 14, 1999 to October 19, 2003, replacing Kapag May Katwiran. Ipaglaban Mo! and it was permanently replaced by Lukso ng Dugo premiered on March 7, 2004.

During its initial television run, the show gained a cult following, especially from the youth, and has been re-aired on Studio 23 from 2007 to 2010 and on Jeepney TV. The series is also accessible already on iWant.

Cast and characters

Main cast
Original
 Kaye Abad as Epifania "Eds/Ponyang" delos Santos
 Paolo Contis as Salvador "Badong" Magtibay
 John Lloyd Cruz as Rolando Victor "Rovic" Mercado
 Desiree del Valle as Corrinne Ledesma
 Patrick Garcia as Jaime "James" Collantes
 Baron Geisler as Alfonso "Fonzy" Ledesma
 Paula Peralejo as Angela "Anne" de Guzman
 Jodi Sta. Maria as Georgina "George" Fuentebella

Additional
 Trina Zuñiga as Maria / Cecilia dela Rhea
 Carol Banawa as Andrea/"Andoy"
 Camille Prats as Natasha 
 Juddha Paolo as Roy
 Angelene Aguilar as Patpi/"Pat P"
 Paolo Paraiso as Dodge
 Maoui David as Hillary
 Brian Tan as Jiggs

Supporting cast 
 Caridad Sanchez as Lola Juling (Rovic's grandmother)
 Mylene Dizon as Jennifer "Jerry" Ricafort
 Ian Galliguez as Sabrina 
 Pen Medina as Epifanio "Panyong" delos Santos (Eds's father)
 Angel Aquino as Tita Pia Fuentebella (George's stepmother)
 Mat Ranillo III as Carlos Fuentebella (George's father)
 Susan Africa as Esperanza "Esper" Magtibay (Badong's mother)

Recurring/extended cast
 Daria Ramirez as Azon delos Santos (Eds's mother)
 Miko Palanca as Perry Sanchez
 Rafael Rosell IV as Oliver McFuller
 Leandro Muñoz as Francisco "Fran" Ledesma Jr. (Fonzy and Corrinne's half-brother)
 Julia Clarete as Cynthia "Pinky" Ledesma (Fonzy and Corrinne's half-sister)
 Gio Alvarez as Roberto "Boyet" delos Santos (Eds's older brother)
 Janette McBride as Fair
 Lito Legaspi as Francisco Ledesma (Fonzy and Corrine's father)
 Jean Saburit as Chedeng Ledesma (Fonzy and Corrinne's mother)
 Mia Gutierrez as Claudia (Rovic's mother)
 Emman Abeleda as Mario Magtibay (Badong's younger brother) and young Badong
 Mel Kimura as Ms. Castro
 Ogie Diaz as Ige
 Kathleen Hermosa as Fonzy and George's HS classmate

Special participation
 Rica Peralejo as Shiela de Guzman (Anne's older sister and the ex-girlfriend of James who committed suicide; appears on flashback scenes)
 Dimples Romana as Jacqueline "Jackie" Cuevas
 Dennis Trillo as Ferdinand Nanding McFuller
 Dan Fernandez as Tito Jun (Rovic's stepfather)
 Beth Tamayo as Sonia
 Al Tantay as Renato de Guzman (Anne's father)
 Marianne dela Riva as Belen de Guzman (Anne's mother)
 Efren Reyes Jr. as Tonyo Magtibay (Badong's father)
 Anna Marin as Elvira "Elvie" Collantes (James's mother)
 Juan Rodrigo as Manuel Collantes (James's father)
 Julie Ann Fortich as Racquel (George's mother)
 Anna Larrucea as Abigail/"Gail"
 Eugene Domingo as Judith "JB" Bradley (Badong and Corrinne's drama class professor)
 Alwyn Uytingco as young Rovic
 Nica Peralejo as young George
 Hazel Ann Mendoza as young Eds
 John Wayne Sace as young James

Guest
 Gerard Pizzaras as Marcelino "Marcy" Hernandez
 Romaro Salcedo as Ryan Cervantes
 Joel Gatchalian as Chuck/Chuckie
 Richard Quan as Basketball coach
 Carlo Muñoz as Frat Master Vince
 Katrina de Leon as Darian
 Don Laurel as Dexter
 Randolph Ranay as Chichi
 Justin Cuyugan as Jay Rodriguez
 Tracy Vergel as Therese "Terry" de Jesus
 Ama Quiambao as Sister Ramona
 Ruel Vernal as Enrique "Bungo" Mercado (Rovic's father)
 Lui Villaruz as Robert Edward "Red/Berto/Bob" Domingo
 Denise Joaquin as Frankie
 Christopher Roxas as Chito Cuevas
 Roselle Nava as Kelly
 Gino Paul Guzman as Mike

Production
Principal location where the series was entirely shot took place in Pagsanjan, Laguna.

Among the original main cast, the actors were in a relationship with their respective on-screen pairs in real life, with the exception of Paula Peralejo and Patrick Garcia who were never been romantically involved off-screen.

Reception
The series was critically well-received and was dubbed by its audience as the Filipino version of the hit American TV series Dawson's Creek.

Awards
 PMPC Star Awards for Television's Best Youth-Oriented Program (1999-2002)

See also
 List of programs broadcast by ABS-CBN

References

External links
 

ABS-CBN drama series
Philippine teen drama television series
1999 Philippine television series debuts
2003 Philippine television series endings
1990s Philippine television series
Filipino-language television shows
Television series about teenagers
Television shows set in the Philippines